Cristian Daniel Campestrini (born 16 June 1980 in Buenos Aires) is an Argentine professional footballer who played as a goalkeeper for Chilean side Deportes Limache.

Club career

Campestrini made his league debut on 10 June 2001 for Rosario Central in a 1–3 home defeat to Belgrano de Córdoba. it was his only league appearance for the club.

In 2002, he began playing in the lower leagues of Argentine football, where he played for Argentino de Rosario, Ferrocarril Oeste, Tigre and Almirante Brown.

In 2008, he returned to the top flight of Argentine football, signing for Arsenal de Sarandí.

Puebla
On 26 July 2015, Campestrini made his Liga MX debut with Puebla in a home match against Club América. In less than two 'short-seasons' he has been sent off four times. Although Campestrini has become one of the most loved player by the supporters.

Deportes Limache
In January 2023, he joined Deportes Limache in the Segunda División Profesional de Chile.

International career
Campestrini was named by Diego Maradona in a callup of local players to play a friendly against Panama on 20 May 2009. He made his international debut in the game, coming on as a second-half substitute in the 3–1 win. He made his second international appearance in a 3–2 friendly win against Costa Rica on 26 January 2010.

Honours
Arsenal de Sarandí
 Argentine Primera División: 2012 Clausura

Puebla
 Supercopa MX: 2015

References

External links

 Argentine Primera statistics at Futbol XXI
 "Seria muy especial"

1980 births
Living people
People from San Nicolás de los Arroyos
Sportspeople from Buenos Aires Province
Argentine footballers
Argentina international footballers
Argentine expatriate footballers
Association football goalkeepers
Argentine Primera División players
Rosario Central footballers
Arsenal de Sarandí footballers
Chacarita Juniors footballers
Primera B Metropolitana players
Primera Nacional players
Argentino de Rosario footballers
Ferro Carril Oeste footballers
Club Atlético Tigre footballers
Club Almirante Brown footballers
Paraguayan Primera División players
Club Olimpia footballers
Liga MX players
Club Puebla players
Ascenso MX players
Liga de Expansión MX players
Dorados de Sinaloa footballers
Club Celaya footballers
Cancún F.C. footballers
Chilean Primera División players
Everton de Viña del Mar footballers
Primera B de Chile players
A.C. Barnechea footballers
Segunda División Profesional de Chile players
Deportes Limache footballers
Argentine expatriate sportspeople in Paraguay
Argentine expatriate sportspeople in Mexico
Argentine expatriate sportspeople in Chile
Expatriate footballers in Paraguay
Expatriate footballers in Mexico
Expatriate footballers in Chile